is a Japanese voice actress from Saitama Prefecture, who is affiliated with Amuleto. After starting her voice acting career in 2014, she played her first main role as Sylvia Silkcut in the 2016 anime series Hybrid × Heart Magias Academy Ataraxia. She is also known for her roles as Sayaka Itomi in Katana Maidens ~ Toji No Miko, Hanako Honda in Asobi Asobase and Ranka Okami in Seton Academy: Join the Pack!.

Biography
Kino was born in Saitama Prefecture on February 12, 1997. She had been interested in anime and manga from an early age, particularly liking the series One Piece and Daily Lives of High School Boys. During her junior high school years, she became aware of the career of voice acting after watching a talk show produced by the gaming magazine Famitsu; her interest in voice acting was further influenced by watching the film One Piece: Episode of Chopper: Bloom in the Winter, Miracle Sakura. Due to these reasons, she decided to pursue a voice acting career upon entering high school.

Kino enrolled in a voice acting training school during her third year of high school. After finishing her training, she made her debut as a voice actor in the 2014 video game Thousand Memories. According to her, as it was her first role and she was nervous about how it would turn out, she decided to "practice rigorously" for the role. Her first anime followed that same year when she played the role of a waitress in an episode of the anime series A Good Librarian Like a Good Shepherd. In 2016, she played her first main role as Silvia Silkcut in the anime series Hybrid × Heart Magias Academy Ataraxia. In 2017, she played the role of Collon in the anime series WorldEnd.

Filmography

Anime
2014
A Good Librarian Like a Good Shepherd (Waitress)

2015
Shomin Sample (Lady, Maid)
Magical Somera-chan (Hamster, Sea Otter, Artificial Human Number 1260)

2016
Erased (Misato)
Aikatsu Stars! (Ayumi Naruse)
Love Live! Sunshine!! (Student)
Qualidea Code (Student)
Hybrid × Heart Magias Academy Ataraxia (Sylvia Silkcut)
Scared Rider Xechs (Female A)

2017
Gabriel DropOut (Alexander, cat, child, crowd, girl, poodle, Ueno)
WorldEnd (Collon)
Senki Zesshō Symphogear AXZ (Tiki)
Princess Principal (Julie)

2018
Katana Maidens ~ Toji No Miko (Sayaka Itomi)
Slow Start (Banbi Fujii)
Steins;Gate 0 (Kaede Kurushima)
Asobi Asobase (Hanako Honda)
Overlord III (Kuuderika)

2019
Mini Toji (Sayaka Itomi)
Sword Art Online: Alicization (Linel)
Wataten!: An Angel Flew Down to Me (Yuu Matsumoto)
Kaguya-sama: Love Is War (Mikiti)
Star☆Twinkle PreCure (Fuwa)
Astra Lost in Space (Funicia Raffaëlli)
YU-NO: A Girl Who Chants Love at the Bound of this World (Ai)
Isekai Cheat Magician (Miro, Mero)
African Office Worker (Sasshō Hamster)

2020
Seton Academy: Join the Pack! (Ranka Ōkami)
Kuma Kuma Kuma Bear (Flora)

2021
Heaven's Design Team (Kenta)
Irina: The Vampire Cosmonaut (Anya Simonyan)

2022
RPG Real Estate (Fa)
Shine Post (Hinatsu Hinomoto)
The Devil Is a Part-Timer!! (Alas Ramus)
PuniRunes (Kūrune)
Management of a Novice Alchemist (Rorea)

2023
Buddy Daddies (Miri Unasaka)
Ayakashi Triangle (Lucy Tsukioka)
Campfire Cooking in Another World with My Absurd Skill (Sui)
Hero Classroom (Cú Chulainn)

Video games
2018
Magia Record (Ikumi Makino)

2020
Project Sekai: Colorful Stage feat. Hatsune Miku (Emu Otori)
Crash Fever (Benedict)

2021
Cookie Run: Kingdom (Moon Rabbit Cookie)
Miitopia (Mii female voice)
Loopers (Holly)
Deep Insanity: Asylum (Penthesilea)

2022
Honkai Impact 3rd (Griseo)
Anonymous;Code (Nonoka Hosho)
World II World (Kirara)

2023
Fire Emblem Engage (Hortensia)
Fuga: Melodies of Steel 2 (Mei Marzipan)
Crymachina (Lilly)
Azur Lane (HMS Royal Oak)

Dubbing
 101 Dalmatian Street (Dallas, Deja Vu, Destiny, Snowball)
 Calamity, a Childhood of Martha Jane Cannary (Elijah)

Live-action
 Anime Supremacy! (2022), Mayu (voice)

References

External links
Official agency profile 

1997 births
Living people
Japanese video game actresses
Japanese voice actresses
Voice actresses from Saitama Prefecture